is a Japanese fencer. He competed at the 1960, 1964 and 1968 Summer Olympics. He taught and coached fencing at Cal State Fullerton until his retirement in June 2006.

References

External links
 

1939 births
Living people
Japanese male épée fencers
Olympic fencers of Japan
Fencers at the 1960 Summer Olympics
Fencers at the 1964 Summer Olympics
Fencers at the 1968 Summer Olympics
Sportspeople from Tokyo
Japanese male foil fencers
20th-century Japanese people
21st-century Japanese people